Didem is a feminine Turkish given name, it may refer to:

Given name
 Diğdem Hoşgör (born 1991), Turkish handball player
 Didem Balık (born 1974), Turkish opera singer
 Didem Ege (born 1988), Turkish volleyball player
 Didem Erol (born 1975), Turkish actress
 Didem Karagenç (born 1993), Turkish footballer
 Didem Kinali (born 1986), Turkish belly dancer
 Didem Taş (born 1992), Turkish footballer
 Didem Ünsal (born 1966), Turkish journalist, television presenter and author

Fictional characters
 Didem, main character in 2011 Turkish romantic comedy film And Then What?

Turkish feminine given names